Aaly is an Asian given name. Notable people with the name include:

 Aaly Karashev (born 1968), Kyrgyz politician
 Aaly Tokombaev (1904–1988), Kyrgyz poet, composer, and writer

See also
 Ally (name)

Asian given names